William Borthwick, 4th Lord Borthwick (died 1542) was a Scottish nobleman.

He succeeded his father William Borthwick, 3rd Lord Borthwick in 1503.

Lord Borthwick inherited a tenement on the south side of Edinburgh's High Street divided into several "lands", and one land was occupied by the merchant James Hommyll. The four African people known as the "More lasses" stayed with Hommyll in November 1504.

After the battle of Flodden in 1513 Lord Borthwick was appointed by the Privy Council of Scotland to the command of Stirling Castle which was ordered to be well fortified, along with the important custody of the infant monarch, King James V of Scotland.

The seal of William, Lord Borthwick, appears on the treaty signed with England on 7 October 1517.

Marriage and family
In 1491 Lord Borthwick married Margaret Hay, eldest daughter of John Hay, 1st Lord Hay of Yester. Their children included:

 Thomas, Master of Borthwick (d. 1528). Died without issue.
 John Borthwick, 5th Lord Borthwick (d. March 1566), a Privy Counsellor who opposed the Scottish Reformation.
 Catherine, (eldest daughter), married Sir James Crichton of Frendraught.
 Jonette, married in 1535, Sir Alexander Lauder of Haltoun, who was killed at the battle of Pinkie.
 Margaret, married Sir John Borthwick of Cineray (who died bef. December 1570).

References

 Burke, Messrs., John and John Bernard, The Royal Families of England, Scotland, and Wales, with their Descendants, etc., London, vol.1, 1848, pedigree CVII.
 Anderson, William, The Scottish Nation, Edinburgh, 1867, vol.ii, p. 339.
 Pine, L.G., The New Extinct Peerage, 1884–1971, London, 1972, p. 33.

1542 deaths
Lords of Parliament (pre-1707)
Scottish diplomats
16th-century Scottish people
Court of James V of Scotland
Scottish soldiers
Year of birth unknown